Nicolas Canteloup (born in Mérignac, Gironde on 4 November 1963) is a French impressionist.

Television career
In 1995, he appeared as impressionist in the TV show Les Guignols de l'info, on Canal +.

In 2005, he first participated in the show Vivement dimanche prochain, hosted by Michel Drucker, broadcast every Sunday afternoon on France 2. Since September 2007, he participates only twice a month, alternating with humorist Anne Roumanoff.

On 5 April 2008, France 2 devoted to Canteloup a prime-time entitled Canteloup, y es-tu ? (reissued on 28 December 2008 at 1:25 pm).

In 2005, he started a radio career hosting Revue de presque on Europe 1.

He was the subject of a documentary, broadcast on France 2 on 26 February 2009 in the weekly show Envoyé spécial.

Tours
In 2005, he went on stage at the Olympia, at the Palais des Glaces and began a tour throughout France.

In 2008, he toured for his show entitled "2ème couche".

References

External links
  Official site

1963 births
Living people
People from Gironde
French humorists
French male writers
French impressionists (entertainers)